Grey County was one of the 26 counties of Western Australia that were designated in 1829 as cadastral divisions. It was named after Charles Grey, 2nd Earl Grey, a powerful opposition Whig MP, who was to become Prime Minister of the United Kingdom of Great Britain and Ireland from 1830-1834. It approximately corresponds to the southern part of the Ninghan Land District which forms the basis for land titles in the area.

References

Counties of Western Australia